Suma Gestión Tributaria (Suma) is a 100% public provincial agency set up by the Provincial Council of Alicante (Spain) in 1990. It specializes in tax administration: assessment, billing, collection and enforcement. Suma collects the taxes on behalf of each city council with own resources.

Its governing body is the Board of Suma, made up of the Executive Director, 7 to 11 Provincial Representatives and it is chaired by the President of the Provincial Council. There is, in addition, a consultative body, called the Council of Mayors, which guarantees the participation of the delegating Town Councils in the strategies adopted by Suma.

The name, Suma (meaning addition), seeks to express a concept of integration, accumulation, growth, and incorporation. In line with this name and the image of the two blue squares, it has developed a corporative culture based on the principle of greater service for the rate-payer and greater service for the municipality.



Location. 

Suma operates in Spain, more specifically in Alicante, one of the 3 provinces which make up the Valencian Community, 
together with Valencia and Castellon.

Activities 

Suma is the local agency responsible for the application of local taxes in all town councils of the Alicante Province. Suma is in fact an advance shared-services scheme based on the economies of scale principle.

Suma performs an integrated tax management service. It is responsible for the processing of local taxes from the first instance of a taxable activity or property to the receipt of tax payment by the municipal authorities. This involves a number of activities: updating the various payment lists, communicating with customers by issuing bills, collecting the taxes by several means (direct debit, credit card). It is also responsible for the enforcement, from notification to selling assets in auction following legal proceedings of the Taxation Act. Suma can also resolve claims and appeals which arise in the collection process, inspect and monitor the proper declaration and payment of taxes. The collected revenue is deposited in the municipal accounts in a monthly basis.

It has delegated powers for the following taxes and fees:

 Property Tax (IBI).
 Economic Activities Tax (IAE).
 Motor Vehicle Tax (IVTM).
 Capital Gains on Land (IIVTNU).
 Tax on Constructions Installations and Works (ICIO).
 Road Traffic Fines.
 As well as other local fees specific to each municipal authority (Waste Disposal Fee, Sewage, Garage Entrances, etc.)

Collaboration with other administrative bodies.

Suma´s experience in this field has led it to collaborate with Spanish local authorities and other international organizations.

 Suma has taken part, as consultants, in drawing up the Strategic Plan for tax services of the Municipal Area of Managua.
 Since 2001, Suma has also worked with the National Association of Portuguese Municipalities, performing analysis and consultancy tasks.
 In addition it takes an active part in several working groups of the Spanish Federation of Municipalities and Provinces.
 It has signed a Collaboration Agreement with the Madrid City Council in areas of consultancy and analysis.

Since 2006 Suma closely works with the Island Council of Gran Canaria in the implementation of a local tax administration system based on Suma model.  Also it is working on similar projects with the Majadahonda Town Council (Madrid region), since 2005 and with the Provincial Council of Albacete, since 2012.

Suma has taken part in forums, conferences and international events and collaborates with institutions as IRRV (Institute of Revenues, Rating and Valuation, GB), Lincoln Institute of Land Policy, USA;  IPTI (International Property Tax Institute, CAN) and IAAO (International Association of Assessing Officers, USA). Also it has developed in partnership a number of European projects in the field of vocational training under the auspices of the Leonardo da Vinci programme.

Facts & Figures 

 On the basis of power delegation agreements, Suma manages local taxes in all municipal areas of the province of Alicante (141 town councils)
 It deals with approximately 2 million rate-payers.
 It has a network of 46 fixed branches throughout the province.

Note: since 1990 to 1993, the name of this public body was Organismo Autonomo Provincial de Gestión Triburaria de Alicante. In 1993, the name was changed to Suma.

References 
 Annual Report (Spanish)

External links 
 Suma Website
 Provincial Council of Alicante Website

Spanish brands